21... Ways to Grow is the third studio album by American R&B singer Shanice. It was released by Motown Records on June 21, 1994 in the United States. Less successful than her 1991 album Inner Child, it peaked at number 46 on the US Billboards Top R&B/Hip-Hop Albums and at number 184 on the US Billboard 200. It includes the minor hit singles "Somewhere" and "Turn Down the Lights."

Critical reception

AllMusic rated the album two out of five stars.

Track listing

Notes
 denotes a co-producer

Charts

References

External links 
 

1994 albums
Shanice albums
Motown albums
Albums produced by Tim & Bob
Albums produced by Jermaine Dupri
Albums produced by Guy Roche
Hip hop albums by American artists